Parimala Nagappa is a politician from the state of Karnataka and wife of Late H. Nagappa. Parimala was elected as M.L.A from Hanur constituency on a Janata Dal (Secular) ticket in the 2004 Karnataka assembly elections. On 16 March 2017, she joined the Bharatiya Janata Party.

References

External links 
Parimala Nagappa affidavit

Living people
Karnataka MLAs 2004–2007
Year of birth missing (living people)
Karnataka politicians
Bharatiya Janata Party politicians from Karnataka